Lampides boeticus, the pea blue, or long-tailed blue, is a small butterfly that belongs to the lycaenids or gossamer-winged family.

Etymology
The Latin species name boeticus refers to Baetica, a province of the Roman Empire in the Iberian Peninsula . Its common name refers to the long streamers on its hind wings, the male's bright iridescent blue colour, and peas, which is the typical host plant of the butterfly.

Distribution
This species can be  found in Europe, Africa, South and Southeast Asia, and Australia.
Also found in the Hawaiian islands.

Habitat

Description
 
The wingspan is 24–32 mm for males and 24–34 mm for females. In these small butterflies (although unusually large for their family) the males have a mainly blue violet upper face of the wings with the brown edges, while the females have only a small amount of blue colour in the centre of the wings (sexual dimorphism). Both sexes have a thin, long tail in the hindwings and two black spots in the anal angle. The underface of the wings is ocher and adorned with white markings and with a larger white submarginal streak. The underface of each hindwing shows a pair of small black eye-spots beside each tail, with an orange marginal spots at the anal angle. This species is rather similar and it can be confused with Leptotes pirithous and Cacyreus marshalli although the pea-blue is significantly larger than both species.

Ecology
This species may have three generations a year. Adults fly from February to early November and are strong migrants.  Eggs are white with a greenish tinge and have a disc-shaped form. They can reach a diameter of 0.5 mm. They are laid singly on the flower buds of the host plants.

Old caterpillars are green or reddish-brown, with dark dorsal stripe. They reach a length of 14-15 mm. Pupae reach  a length of 9-10 mm.  They are light grayish-brown with medium-sized dark spots and dark dorsal stripe.

The larvae feed on flowers, seeds and pods of many Fabaceae species, including Medicago, Crotalaria, Polygala, Sutherlandia, Dolichos, Cytisus, Spartium and Lathyrus species. It has also been recorded on Crotolaria pallida.

In Australia, the larvae are occasionally attended by ants in the genera Froggattella, Iridomyrmex or Camponotus''.

See also
List of butterflies of Australia
List of butterflies of India
List of butterflies of India (Lycaenidae)
List of butterflies of Menorca

Bibliography

Tom Tolman et Richard Lewington, Guide des papillons d'Europe et d'Afrique du Nord, Delachaux et Niestlé, 1997

References

External links

 Paolo Mazzei, Daniel Morel, Raniero Panfili Moths and Butterflies of Europe and North Africa
 Lepiforum.de

boeticus
Butterflies of Africa
Butterflies of Asia
Butterflies of Europe
Butterflies of Oceania
Butterflies of Indochina
Butterflies of Australia
Butterflies of Indonesia
Butterflies of Malaysia
Butterflies of Singapore
Lepidoptera of New Guinea
Lepidoptera of the Philippines
Insects of Hawaii
Insects of Cape Verde
Agricultural pest insects
Butterflies described in 1767
Taxa named by Carl Linnaeus
Articles containing video clips